L.L.Bean is an American privately-held retail company that was founded in 1912 by Leon Leonwood Bean. The company, headquartered in the place in which it was founded, in Freeport, Maine, specializes in clothing and outdoor recreation equipment.

Company history

L.L.Bean was founded in 1912 by its namesake, hunter and fisherman Leon Leonwood Bean, in Freeport, Maine. The company began as a one-room operation selling a single product, the Maine Hunting Shoe, also known as duck boots  and later as Bean Boots. Bean had developed a waterproof boot, which is a combination of lightweight leather uppers and rubber bottoms, that he sold to hunters. He obtained a list of nonresident Maine hunting license holders, prepared a descriptive mail order circular, set up a shop in his brother's basement in Freeport and started a nationwide mail-order business. By 1912, he was selling the Bean Boot through a four-page mail-order catalog, and the boot remains a staple of the company's outdoor image. Defects in the initial design led to 90 percent of the original production run being returned: Bean honored his money-back guarantee, corrected the design, and continued selling them.

According to Bean, relating the incorporation of the company, "officers elected Nov. 16, 1934...L.L. Bean, President and Treasurer; Carl Bean Vice President and Assistant Treasurer; Jack Gorman, my son-in-law, Vice President and Clothing Buyer; and Warren Bean, my son, Clerk."  Gross sales for his company amounted to $1 million in 1946, increasing to $3.8 million in 1966, $20.4 million in 1974, and $237.4 million in 1984.

The  L.L.Bean retail store campus in Freeport, Maine, is open 24 hours a day, 365 days a year.

Leon L. Bean died on February 5, 1967, in Pompano Beach, Florida and was buried in Webster Cemetery in Freeport. The company passed into the directorship of Bean's grandson, Leon Gorman, from that time until 2001, when Gorman decided to take the position of chairman. Christopher McCormick assumed the role of CEO, the first non-family member to assume the title. On May 19, 2013, Shawn Gorman, 47, a great-grandson of the company's founder, was elected L.L.Bean's chairman. The company announced a US$125,000 donation to a new scholarship fund upon Leon Gorman's death in 2015, representing about 2.5 years of tuition at Bowdoin College, Gorman's alma mater.

Stephen Smith was named chief executive officer (CEO) in November 2015, the first time in the company's 103-year history that a CEO had been hired from outside the company.

Product line
The company sells a variety of hiking, weather, and other utility boots, along with other outdoor equipment such as firearms, backpacks, and tents, and produces a full line of clothing, which is now its mainstay.

L.L.Bean sources its products from the US and across the globe. As of 2016, its Brunswick, Maine factory employed more than 450 people who made the company's products by hand, such as the Maine Hunting Shoe, L.L.Bean Boot, Boat and Totes, dog beds, leather goods, and backpacks.

In 2000, L.L.Bean partnered with Japanese automaker Subaru, making L.L.Bean the official outfitter of Subaru, spawning the L.L.Bean edition Subaru Outback and Subaru Forester for the US market. The L.L.Bean trim levels were top-spec versions, with most available options included as standard equipment. This relationship with Subaru ended June 28, 2008.

In 2010, L.L.Bean created a contemporary sub-brand called L.L.Bean Signature. The Signature line is a modern interpretation of L.L.Bean's previous products with modern fits.

Retail stores

Along with a number of retail and outlet stores, the company maintains its flagship store on Main Street in Freeport, Maine. This branch, originally opened in 1917, has been open 24 hours a day since 1951, with the exception of two Sundays in 1962 when Maine changed its blue laws; a town vote later reinstated the store's open-door policy. The flagship has closed to honor the death of U.S. President John F. Kennedy in 1963, and the deaths of founder Leon Bean in 1967 and his grandson Leon Gorman in 2015. Due to the COVID-19 pandemic worldwide, all L.L.Bean stores were closed indefinitely starting on March 17, 2020, at midnight. It became the fifth time in the company's history that the flagship closed, and the first time it has ever closed for more than 24 hours. The company began to reopen stores in May 2020.

L.L.Bean has invested heavily in activities for both visitors and residents in Freeport, including its Outdoor Discovery Schools, Christmas light displays, and its Summer Concert Series, which has attracted artists such as Grace Potter, Lake Street Dive, Edwin McCain, Great Big Sea, Buckwheat Zydeco, and Rockapella.

L.L.Bean opened its first outlet store in North Conway, New Hampshire, in 1988. The company operates 30 retail stores and 10 factory outlets in the US, and 25 retail stores in Japan, in addition to its catalog and online sales operations.

The L.L.Bean Bootmobile travels the United States and serves as a mobile store during its college tour with a limited selection of products.

In March 2018, L.L.Bean opened their first urban location in Boston's Seaport District. The  store will be the model for further expansion in urban areas and carry a selection of merchandise selected to fit the surrounding community.

In November 2019, it was announced that L.L.Bean will be launching in the UK.

Returns policy
From its founding, L.L.Bean had an unlimited return policy, which allowed customers to return items with which they were dissatisfied at any time, even without a purchase receipt. On February 9, 2018, the company announced it would be limiting returns to within one year of purchase, and only with a receipt or other proof of purchase. L.L.Bean said that some customers had been abusing the policy by returning items that had been purchased from yard sales and third parties or used the policy as a lifetime replacement program for items with normal wear and tear. L.L.Bean has also stated it reserves the right to deny returns to those who regularly return items.

International expansion
L.L. Bean has ventured into international markets notably Japan and Canada, starting with Japan in 1976 with L.L. Bean bags debuting at American Life Shop BEAMS in Tokyo's Harajuku district in 1976. It opened its first outlet in Japan in November 1992, and then expanding to 28 stores in the country by November 2018. The company then ventured into the Canadian market, launching an e-commerce site in 2018 under licensing by Toronto-based Jaytex Group and expansion directed under Brokerage Oberfeld Snowcap, and opening its first outlet in 2019 in Oakville, Ontario, with at least eight stores opened by the end of 2021 with plans to operate at least 20 more. 

In 2020, the company expanded its outlets in Ontario, including one at Ottawa's Train Yards, one at the Georgian Mall in Barrie, and one at Vaughan Mills.    

In 2021, the company opened outlets at Toronto's Shops at Don Mills, one at Halifax, Nova Scotia's Dartmouth Crossing, two in British Columbia, one in Victoria's Mayfair Mall and one at Burnaby's The Amazing Brentwood, one at Calgary Alberta's Deerfoot Meadows retail centre. 2022 saw the Ontario openings of one at Kitchener's The Boardwalk, Kingston's Cataraqui Mall, and one at Moncton, New Brunswick's Champlain Place, with one planned at Niagara Falls and one at Edmonton, Alberta later this year.

Political controversy
In January 2017, a group of political activists called for a boycott against the company after it was disclosed that Linda Bean, one of the descendants of founder Leon Leonwood Bean who sits on the board of directors, had donated US$60,000 to a political action committee that supported Donald Trump's 2016 presidential campaign. There were assertions that the contribution may be illegal. Trump posted on Twitter, in support of Linda Bean after calls for the boycott, "Thank you to Linda Bean of L.L.Bean for your great support and courage. People will support you even more now. Buy L.L.Bean." The company said it had not donated to Trump, nor have any of the other directors or any of the 50 other Bean heirs. It was unclear if the publicity hurt business, since sales were flat prior and for a second straight year in 2016.

Outdoor Discovery Schools
L.L.Bean has education programs connected to many of its retail outlets to support the outdoor interests of its customers. Customers can sign up to participate in a number of outdoor activities; all equipment and instruction are provided. Activities include archery, clay shooting, fly casting, and sea kayaking. More advanced classes are conducted as well, and must be reserved in advance.  Snowshoeing and cross country skiing are available December to March. All other retail stores offer fly casting and kayaking and stand-up paddleboarding.

In popular culture

 Netflix Show Luke Cage references the company's return policy in Season 1, Episode 3. The character Cornell "Cottonmouth" Stokes (Mahershala Ali) is quoted saying "There ain't no return policy, this ain't L.L.Bean."
 Netflix Show Unbreakable Kimmy Schmidt character Jacqueline Voorhees (Jane Krakowski) jokes that the title character is "a model for L.L.Bean’s performance fleeces" in Season 2 Episode 3.
 The Official Preppy Handbook, a description of upper-class and upper-middle-class life in America, describes L.L.Bean as "nothing less than Prep mecca."
 Author Hunter S. Thompson referred to wearing L.L.Bean shorts in a number of his works, most notably during the "Wave Speech" featured in chapter eight of Fear and Loathing in Las Vegas.
 The 1990 Paul Rudnick novel I'll Take It was a humorous tale of a Long Island mother taking some of her children on a fall shopping trip through New England with L.L.Bean being the final destination. As the plot unfolds, the mother divulges to her son that she is actually planning to rob L.L.Bean in order to update her and her husband's furniture in their retirement.
 The blog Your LL Bean Boyfriend features the male models of the L.L.Bean Catalog paired with captions that the perfect boyfriend might say.
 In the 1988 film Beetlejuice, while looking around the horribly outdated house the interior designer character Otho exclaims "Ooo. Deliver me from L.L.Bean!"
 Alfred Gingold's Items from Our Catalog is a parody of the L.L.Bean catalog.

 In "Nothing to Fear" from the Muppet series Bear in the Big Blue House, Bear receives a skunk clock in the mail from the parody company "L.L. Bear."

Citations

General and cited references

External links
 

 
1912 establishments in Maine
Camping equipment manufacturers
Clothing brands of the United States
Clothing companies established in 1912
Companies based in Cumberland County, Maine
Economy of the Northeastern United States
Freeport, Maine
Mail-order retailers
Online clothing retailers of the United States
Outdoor clothing brands
Privately held companies based in Maine
Shoe companies of the United States
Sporting goods retailers of the United States
Sportswear brands
Retail companies established in 1912